OWN Spotlight: Where Do We Go From Here? is a two-part television special moderated by Oprah Winfrey in response to the protests over the murder of George Floyd. It is a discussion show where Winfrey speaks directly about systematic racism, police brutality in the United States, and the current state of America with a variety of African American thought leaders, activists and artists. It was broadcast from June 9 to 10, 2020 on all networks owned by Discovery, Inc., including the Oprah Winfrey Network, which produced the special.

Guests

Broadcast
The special was broadcast on June 9 and 10, 2020 at 9pm ET/PT on the Oprah Winfrey Network and simulcast on all remaining 18 Discovery-owned networks in the United States, including Discovery Channel, American Heroes Channel, Animal Planet, Cooking Channel, Destination America, Discovery en Español, Discovery Family, Discovery Familia, Discovery Life, DIY Network, Food Network, Great American Country, HGTV, Investigation Discovery, Motor Trend, Science Channel, TLC, and Travel Channel. The special was also streamed on OWN's Facebook, Instagram, and YouTube accounts, the TV Everywhere apps of OWN and Discovery Family, and Discovery's international platforms. This marked the first time an OWN special was simulcast on Discovery's family of networks.

Ratings
During the special's television simulcast, the debut broadcast of Part 1 received 4.52 million viewers, while the initial airing of Part 2 received 3.73 million viewers. Combined, the special averaged an audience of over 7.3 million. On OWN alone, the two-nights of the hour-long special averaged 1.4 million viewers.

The special also received 6.7 million views on Discovery's online platforms, including Facebook and YouTube, racking up a total viewership of 17.6 million across all platforms.

References

External links

2020 in American television
2020 television specials
Oprah Winfrey
Oprah Winfrey Network original programming